Vilayada Vaa is a 2012 Tamil language sports drama directed by Vijay Nantha. The film stars Viswanath Balaji and Divya Padmini. This film marks the Tamil debut of the director and music director, Srimurali.

Plot 
Deva is a low class man who enjoys carrom and plays with his friends. He adopts Naveen, who becomes an expert at the game. The story revolves around Naveen's struggles toward success in the world of carrom.

Cast 

Viswanath Balaji as Naveen
Divya Padmini as Divya
Ponvannan as Deva
Lakshmy Ramakrishnan as Devi
Livingston as Jyothi
Charle as Doctor
Mayilsamy as Johnny
Aishwarya as Anu 
Manobala as Kothandam
Meera Krishnan as Divya's mother
 A. C. Murali Mohan as Divya's father
Kottachi
Ambani Shankar as Guna
Kovai Senthil

Production  
Vijay Nantha, who previously directed a film in Telugu, began working on his second film. The producer, K. Tripura Sundhari, called Vijay Natha  on producing a film and the former recalls how coincidentally his son, Viswanath Balaji, was chosen to portray the lead role. Balaji is a television actor and makes his film debut through Vilayada Vaa. Divya Padmini and Aishwarya Rajesh also star in the film. The director wanted to shed light on the game of carrom through this film.

Themes 
The director, Vijayanand, stated that "The carrom board is used as a methaphor for life in the film that is about the hero's fight to be a successful player".

Soundtrack 
The songs were composed by Srimurali, who previously worked in Kannada, Malayalam, and Telugu films. The audio was released by K. S. Ravikumar in November 2011.

Release 
A critic from Dinamalar praised the film's screenplay. Maalai Malar praised the carrom scenes and the songs.

References 

2010s Tamil-language films
2010s sports drama films
Indian sports drama films
2012 drama films
2012 films
Films scored by Srimurali